Peter Grant (born 12 October 1960) is a Scottish politician who has served as the Member of Parliament (MP) for Glenrothes since his election in the 2015 general election. He is a member of the Scottish National Party (SNP).

Early life

Grant was raised in Lanarkshire and moved to Glenrothes in 1983. He married Fiona who later served as a Scottish National Party councillor. He joined the Scottish National Party in 1987.

Political career

Early politics

Grant served on the council in Fife from the Glenrothes and Kinglassie ward from 1992 to 2015. During his tenure on the council he served as leader of the Fife Council from 2007 to 2012, with a coalition between the Scottish National Party and the Liberal Democrats. In 2015, he left the council so that he could focus on his campaign for a seat in the House of Commons of the United Kingdom.

EU Referendum
During a speech in Parliament on Monday 5 September 2016, Peter Grant equated campaigners for leaving the European Union, to the extreme right, when he said "The referendum was provoked by the desire of the then Prime Minister to fend off a challenge from the extreme right—not only the extreme right in the Conservative party, but those who were too extreme for his party—rather than facing down the xenophobes who wanted to demonise immigration and hold immigrants responsible for all the ills in our society."

House of Commons

Elections

Member of Parliament John MacDougall died in 2008, causing a by-election to be held in the Glenrothes constituency. Grant was selected to serve as the Scottish National Party's candidate, being the first candidate nominated by a party in the by-election, and was defeated by Labour nominee Lindsay Roy. Alex Salmond, the leader of the Scottish National Party, stated that he was at fault for the party's defeat in the by-election.

Grant was the Scottish National Party's candidate in the 2015 general election and defeated Labour nominee Melanie Ward, and Conservative nominee Alex Stewart-Clark. He was re-elected in the 2017 general election against Labour nominee Altany Craik and Conservative nominee Andrew Brown. He was re-elected in the 2019 general election against Labour nominee Pat Egan, Conservative nominee Amy Thomson, and Liberal Democrats nominee Jane Ann Liston.

Tenure

Grant served as the Scottish National Party Spokesperson for Exiting the European Union from 20 June 2017 to 7 January 2020, until he was replaced by Philippa Whitford. He has served as the Assistant Spokesperson for the Treasury since 7 January 2020.

Political positions

In July 2021, Grant apologised for a post on Twitter he made stating that "You're more right than you care to admit. Murdering babies wasn't on the Nazi manifesto." Marie van der Zyl, president of the Board of Deputies of British Jews, stated that "We are disturbed by the suggestion from some MPs that Nazism only gradually revealed its true aims."

Grant supported Nicola Sturgeon's condemnation of transphobia.

Electoral history

References

External links

 
 Profile on SNP website

1960 births
Living people
Councillors in Fife
Members of the Parliament of the United Kingdom for Fife constituencies
People from Coatbridge
Scottish National Party councillors
Scottish National Party MPs
UK MPs 2015–2017
UK MPs 2017–2019
UK MPs 2019–present
Politicians from North Lanarkshire